Royce Burke-Flynn is an Irish rugby union player. He previously played for Leinster Rugby.  His preferred position is prop. It was announced in April 2015 that he had been awarded a senior contract with Leinster and having previously played with Leinster 'A'.

References

Irish rugby union players
1987 births
Living people
Rugby union props